Actinopolymorpha is a genus in the phylum Actinomycetota (Bacteria).

Etymology
The name Actinopolymorpha derives from:Greek noun ; Greek adjective , multiform, manifold; New Latin feminine gender noun (New Latin feminine gender adjective used as a substantive) Actinopolymorpha, actinomycete of many shapes.

Species
The genus contains four species, namely
 A. alba Cao et al. 2009 (Latin feminine gender adjective alba, white, referring to the white substrate mycelium.)
 A. cephalotaxi Yuan et al. 2010 (New Latin genitive case noun cephalotaxi, of Cephalotaxus, isolated from Cephalotaxus fortunei from which the rhizosphere soil sample was collected.)
 A. pittospori Kaewkla and Franco 2011
 A. rutila Wang et al. 2008 (Latin feminine gender adjective rutila, red inclining to golden-yellow, referring to the colour of colonies produced.)
 A. singaporensis Wang et al. 2001 (New Latin feminine gender adjective singaporensis, of or belonging to Singapore, signifying the country where the type strain was isolated.)

See also
 Bacterial taxonomy
 Microbiology

References 

Bacteria genera
Propionibacteriales